Emil Dumitriu (born 5 November 1942), commonly known as Nichi Dumitru or Dumitriu II, is a Romanian former footballer who played as a forward.

Club career
Emil "Nichi" Dumitriu was born on 5 November 1942 in Bucharest, Romania, starting to play youth level football in 1957 at Locomotiva București, afterwards moving at Progresul CPCS București. He made his Divizia A debut on 25 March 1962, playing for Jiul Petroșani in a 3–2 victory against UTA Arad. In the following season he played in the first half at Viitorul București, moving in the second half at Rapid București. During his period spent at Rapid, he made a successful couple in the team's offence with Ion Ionescu, winning the first league title from the club's history in the 1966–67 season in which he was used by coach Valentin Stănescu in 26 matches in which he scored 12 goals, also winning two Balkans Cup. He suffered a lung illness which kept him off the field for one year and a half, being taken by coach Valentin Stănescu at Steagul Roșu Brașov, trying to help him relaunch his career. In 1971 Dumitriu went to play for one season at Dinamo București, afterwards returning for two seasons at Rapid where he made his last Divizia A appearance on 10 March 1974 in a 2–0 away loss against Argeș Pitești, having a total of 235 matches in which he scored 68 goals in the competition, also having 3 appearances in the 1967–68 European Cup and one in the 1972–73 European Cup Winners' Cup. Emil Dumitriu ended his career by playing three seasons in Divizia B, the first one at Chimia Râmnicu Vâlcea and the other two at Progresul București, helping both teams earn promotion to Divizia A.

International career
Emil Dumitriu played 6 games and scored 3 goals at international level for Romania, making his debut under coach Ilie Oană on 23 October 1965 in a 2–1 away loss against Turkey at the 1966 World Cup qualifiers. He played two games at the Euro 1968 qualifiers in which he scored a hat-trick in a 7–0 victory against Cyprus after which the opponents captain Kostas Panayiotou said:"Dumitriu's game is simply confusing. He is an opponent who creates nightmares". He made his last appearance for the national team on 5 June 1968 in a friendly which ended 0–0 against Netherlands. Emil Dumitriu also played 13 games in which he scored 4 goals for Romania U23 and appeared in a friendly game for Romania's Olympic football team which ended with a 2–1 away victory against Yugoslavia, being part of the squad that participated at the 1964 Summer Olympics from Tokyo where he did not play in any games as he got injured in a training session by teammate Mircea Petescu.

International goals
Scores and results list Romania's goal tally first, score column indicates score after each Dumitriu goal.

Personal life
Emil Dumitriu is the older elder of Dumitru Dumitriu (Dumitriu III), who also appeared internationally for Romania and played for Rapid București before becoming a manager, and Constantin Dumitriu (Dumitriu IV) who won the Romanian championship with Steaua București. In 1987, he settled in Athens, Greece, being married with a Greek woman.

Honours
Rapid București
Divizia A: 1966–67
Balkans Cup: 1963–64, 1964–66
Chimia Râmnicu Vâlcea
Divizia B: 1973–74
Progresul București
Divizia B: 1975–76

References

External links

1942 births
Living people
Footballers from Bucharest
Romanian footballers
Romania international footballers
Olympic footballers of Romania
Footballers at the 1964 Summer Olympics
Association football forwards
CSM Jiul Petroșani players
FC Rapid București players
FC Brașov (1936) players
FC Dinamo București players
FC Progresul București players
Chimia Râmnicu Vâlcea players
Liga I players
Liga II players